Dale H. Learn (December 8, 1897 – March 16, 1976) was an American real estate agent and politician from Pennsylvania. A lifelong temperance advocate, Learn was twice a candidate for political office with the Prohibition Party; in 1942, he ran for Governor of Pennsylvania and in 1948, he was the party's vice-presidential nominee.

He was the Prohibition Party's candidate for Governor of Pennsylvania in 1942. He finished in third place (17,385 votes or 0.68%).

In June 1947, the Prohibition Party nominated a presidential ticket for the following year which included Learn as vice-president and Claude A. Watson of California at the top of the ticket. The pair received 103,708 votes (0.21%), which placed it sixth nationwide.

Personal life
Learn was born in Paradise Township, Monroe County, Pennsylvania to Milton S. and Nettie (Bush) Learn. He was an alumnus of East Stroudsburg State Teachers College, Dickinson College, and the Dickinson School of Law. A real estate agent, Learn was the youngest person to serve as president of the Pennsylvania Real Estate Association. He died in 1976 and is buried at Laurelwood Cemetery in Stroudsburg, Pennsylvania.

References

1897 births
1976 deaths
People from East Stroudsburg, Pennsylvania
East Stroudsburg University of Pennsylvania alumni
Dickinson College alumni
Dickinson School of Law alumni
Pennsylvania Prohibitionists
Prohibition Party (United States) vice presidential nominees
1948 United States vice-presidential candidates